Hexaresta is a genus of fruit flies in the family Tephritidae.

Species

References 

Phytalmiinae
Tephritidae genera